Tom Emmatty  is an Indian film director, screenwriter and actor working in Malayalam cinema. Emmatty's debut film Oru Mexican Aparatha, collected more than 20cr from release centers.

Personal life
Tom Emmatty was born in Mattom, a village near Thrissur.

Film career
Emmatty started working in film industry as an assistant director for Roopesh Peethambaran’s You Too Brutus. His film Oru Mexican Aparatha movie is based on the campus politics of Maharaja's College, Ernakulam, Kerala. Oru Mexican Aparatha features Tovino Thomas, Roopesh Peethambaran, Kalabhavan Shajon and Neeraj Madhav in lead roles. Tom's next movie was The Gambler (2019 film) which features Anson Paul, and emmatty's son George Emmatty in lead role. Emmatty's upcoming movie is Duniyavinte Orattathu which features Sudhi Koppa, Sreenath Bhasi and Anu Sithara in lead roles.

Filmography

References

External links 
 

Malayalam film directors
Living people
Film directors from Kerala
Malayalam screenwriters
Screenwriters from Kerala
Year of birth missing (living people)